This page is an overview of Chile at the UCI Track Cycling World Championships.

2016 

Chile competed at the 2016 UCI Track Cycling World Championships at the Lee Valley VeloPark in London, United Kingdom from 2–4 March 2016. A team of 1 cyclists (0 women, 1 men) was announced to represent the country in the event.

Results

Men

Sources

References

Nations at the UCI Track Cycling World Championships
Chile at cycling events